Seydabad (also romanized as Seydābād and Sa‘īdābād) is a village in Jafarbay-ye Jonubi Rural District, in the Central District of Torkaman County, Golestan Province, Iran. At the 2006 census, its population was 447, in 82 families.

References 

Populated places in Torkaman County